Denis Carufel (born January 23, 1954) is a Canadian former ice hockey defenceman. He was selected by the Kansas City Scouts in the tenth round (162nd overall) of the 1974 NHL amateur draft, and was also drafted by the Quebec Nordiques in the seventh round (98th overall) of the 1974 WHA Amateur Draft.

In 1999, Carufel was named to the All-time Sorel Black Hawks team (QMJHL) by a Canadian Hockey League panel.

Awards and honours

References

External links

1954 births
Living people
Canadian ice hockey defencemen
Ice hockey people from Quebec City
Kansas City Scouts draft picks
Maine Nordiques players
Quebec Nordiques (WHA) draft picks
Sorel Éperviers players